The 2018 Havant Borough Council election took place on 3 May 2018 to elect members of Havant Borough Council in England. This was on the same day as other local elections.

After the election, the composition of the council was:

 Conservative: 33
 UKIP: 2
 Labour: 2
 Liberal Democrats: 1

Results 
The Conservatives, Labour and Liberal Democrats all won seats this election, with the Conservatives gaining two of UKIP's four seats; the Conservatives won 13 of the 15 seats up for election, with Labour and the Liberal Democrats holding one seat each which was up for election; two seats in Hayling West were up for election.

Ward results

Barncroft

Battins

Bedhampton

Bondfields

Cowplain

Emsworth

Hart Plain

Hayling East

Hayling West

Purbrook

St Faith's

Stakes

Warren Park

Waterloo

References 

2018 English local elections
Havant Borough Council elections
2010s in Hampshire